Nagaland Institute of Medical Science and Research popularly known as Kohima Medical College is a medical college currently under construction in Phriebagie, Kohima, Nagaland. It will be the first Medical College in the Indian state of Nagaland and is expected to begin its academic session from 2022 onwards.

History
The foundation for Nagaland Medical College was laid by the Chief Minister of Nagaland Neiphiu Rio in 2014 The sanctioned amount was received in 2015 but construction could not take off due to land issue.

References

External links 

Medical colleges in Nagaland
Universities and colleges in Nagaland